The 2000–01 NBA season was the Spurs' 25th season in the National Basketball Association, their 28th season in San Antonio, and their 34th season as a franchise. During the off-season, the Spurs signed free agents Derek Anderson, and Danny Ferry. All-Star forward Tim Duncan had nearly signed a free agent deal with the Orlando Magic, but decided to stay with the Spurs. The team got off to a 13–9 start, then won ten of their next twelve games, and held a 31–16 record at the All-Star break. The Spurs continued to be among the NBA's elite teams, winning 23 of their final 29 games to recapture the Midwest Division with a 58–24 record, which was the best record in the league, while posting a league best 33–8 record at home.

Duncan averaged 22.2 points, 12.2 rebounds and 2.3 blocks per game and was named to the All-NBA First Team, and to the NBA-All Defensive First Team, while David Robinson averaged 14.4 points, 8.6 rebounds and 2.5 blocks per game, and was named to the All-NBA Third Team. In addition, Anderson provided the team with 15.5 points and 1.5 steals per game, while off the bench, Antonio Daniels contributed 9.4 points per game, and Malik Rose provided with 7.7 points and 5.4 rebounds per game in only 57 games. Duncan and Robinson were both selected for the 2001 NBA All-Star Game. Duncan also finished in second place in Most Valuable Player voting behind Allen Iverson of the Philadelphia 76ers, and in third place in Defensive Player of the Year voting, while Robinson finished tied in fifth place.

In the Western Conference First Round of the playoffs, the Spurs would easily defeat the Minnesota Timberwolves in four games. In the Western Conference Semi-finals, they beat the 5th-seeded Dallas Mavericks in five games to advance to the Western Conference Finals, where they were swept in four straight games by the 2nd-seeded defending, and eventual back-to-back NBA champion Los Angeles Lakers, who were led by Shaquille O'Neal and Kobe Bryant. The Lakers would reach the NBA Finals to defeat the 76ers in five games, winning their second consecutive championship.

Following the season, Anderson was traded along with Steve Kerr to the Portland Trail Blazers, while Avery Johnson re-signed as a free agent with the Denver Nuggets, Samaki Walker signed with the Los Angeles Lakers, and Sean Elliott retired ending his twelve-year career in the NBA, eleven which he spent playing with the Spurs.

Draft picks

Roster

Regular season

Season standings

z - clinched division title
y - clinched division title
x - clinched playoff spot

Record vs. opponents

Game log

Regular season 

|- bgcolor="#ccffcc"
| 1
| October 31
| Indiana
| 
| David Robinson (22)
| Tim Duncan (10)
| Antonio Daniels (6)
| Alamodome17,450
| 1–0

|- bgcolor="#ccffcc"
| 2
| November 2
| Timberwolves
| 
| Derek Anderson (29)
| Malik Rose (10)
| Derek Anderson (5)
| Alamodome14,193
| 2–0
|- bgcolor="#ccffcc"
| 3
| November 4
| @ Golden State
| 
| Malik Rose (26)
| Tim Duncan (13)
| Avery Johnson (6)
| The Arena in Oakland16,121
| 3–0
|- bgcolor="#ffcccc"
| 4
| November 7
| @ Phoenix
| 
| Tim Duncan (18)
| Tim Duncan (10)
| Avery Johnson (5)
| America West Arena16,683
| 3–1
|- bgcolor="#ccffcc"
| 5
| November 8
| L. A. Lakers
| 
| Tim Duncan (22)
| Tim Duncan (17)
| Avery Johnson, Antonio Daniels (7)
| Alamodome26,065
| 4–1
|- bgcolor="#ffcccc"
| 6
| November 10
| @ Dallas
| 
| Derek Anderson (17)
| Tim Duncan, David Robinson (14)
| Tim Duncan (4)
| Reunion Arena17,296
| 4–2
|- bgcolor="#ccffcc"
| 7
| November 11
| Vancouver
| 
| Tim Duncan (20)
| Tim Duncan (13)
| Antonio Daniels (7)
| Alamodome18,556
| 5–2
|- bgcolor="#ccffcc"
| 8
| November 14
| Utah
| 
| Tim Duncan, Derek Anderson (15)
| Tim Duncan (12)
| Avery Johnson (6)
| Alamodome17,296
| 6–2
|- bgcolor="#ccffcc"
| 9
| November 16
| @ Washington
| 
| David Robinson (21)
| David Robinson (14)
| Tim Duncan (6)
| MCI Center19,832
| 7–2
|- bgcolor="#ffcccc"
| 10
| November 17
| @ Minnesota
| 
| Tim Duncan (22)
| Tim Duncan (14)
| Tim Duncan, Avery Johnson (5)
| Target Center17,288
| 7–3
|- bgcolor="#ccffcc"
| 11
| November 22
| Seattle
| 
| Malik Rose (22)
| Tim Duncan (12)
| Avery Johnson (6)
| Alamodome22,828
| 8–3
|- bgcolor="#ffcccc"
| 12
| November 24
| @ Denver
| 
| Tim Duncan (21)
| Tim Duncan (14)
| Tim Duncan (5)
| Pepsi Center13,300
| 8–4
|- bgcolor="#ccffcc"
| 13
| November 25
| Philadelphia
| 
| Derek Anderson, Antonio Daniels (16)
| David Robinson (8)
| Antonio Daniels (5)
| Alamodome33,046
| 9–4
|- bgcolor="#ccffcc"
| 14
| November 29
| Sacramento
| 
| Tim Duncan (22)
| Tim Duncan (13)
| Avery Johnson (8)
| Alamodome17,341
| 10–4

|- bgcolor="#ffcccc"
| 15
| December 1
| @ L. A. Lakers
| 
| Tim Duncan (24)
| Tim Duncan (11)
| Derek Anderson, Avery Johnson (5)
| Staples Center18,997
| 10–5
|- bgcolor="#ccffcc"
| 16
| December 3
| @ Vancouver
| 
| Tim Duncan (30)
| Tim Duncan (10)
| Derek Anderson, Antonio Daniels (7)
| General Motors Place11,655
| 11–5
|- bgcolor="#ffcccc"
| 17
| December 5
| @ Sacramento
| 
| Tim Duncan (23)
| Tim Duncan (23)
| Terry Porter (4)
| ARCO Arena17,317
| 11–6
|- bgcolor="#ffcccc"
| 18
| December 7
| New York
| 
| Tim Duncan (28)
| Tim Duncan (10)
| Avery Johnson (3)
| Alamodome18,370
| 11–7
|- bgcolor="#ccffcc"
| 19
| December 9
| Chicago
| 
| Tim Duncan (17)
| Tim Duncan (10)
| Terry Porter, Avery Johnson (5)
| Alamodome19,447
| 12–7
|- bgcolor="#ccffcc"
| 20
| December 11
| @ Utah
| 
| Derek Anderson (18)
| Malik Rose (11)
| Antonio Daniels (4)
| Delta Center19,911
| 13–7
|- bgcolor="#ffcccc"
| 21
| December 13
| @ Phoenix
| 
| Derek Anderson (26)
| Tim Duncan (11)
| Tim Duncan, Derek Anderson (3)
| America West Arena17,333
| 13–8
|- bgcolor="#ffcccc"
| 22
| December 14
| Denver
| 
| David Robinson (23)
| David Robinson (12)
| Antonio Daniels (6)
| Alamodome15,248
| 13–9
|- bgcolor="#ccffcc"
| 23
| December 16
| Phoenix
| 
| David Robinson (18)
| Tim Duncan (8)
| Antonio Daniels (6)
| Alamodome30,555
| 14–9
|- bgcolor="#ccffcc"
| 24
| December 19
| @ Houston
| 
| Tim Duncan (25)
| Tim Duncan (15)
| Derek Anderson (4)
| Compaq Center12,937
| 15–9
|- bgcolor="#ccffcc"
| 25
| December 20
| Cleveland
| 
| Danny Ferry (16)
| David Robinson (13)
| Terry Porter (7)
| Alamodome17,336
| 16–9
|- bgcolor="#ccffcc"
| 26
| December 22
| Golden State
| 
| Tim Duncan (18)
| Tim Duncan (13)
| Tim Duncan, Derek Anderson (4)
| Alamodome16,481
| 17–9
|- bgcolor="#ffcccc"
| 27
| December 23
| @ Charlotte
| 
| Tim Duncan (29)
| Tim Duncan (16)
| Antonio Daniels (8)
| Charlotte Coliseum15,079
| 17–10
|- bgcolor="#ccffcc"
| 28
| December 26
| Houston
| 
| Antonio Daniels (26)
| David Robinson (12)
| Antonio Daniels (10)
| Alamodome21,343
| 18–10
|- bgcolor="#ffcccc"
| 29
| December 28
| @ Chicago
| 
| David Robinson (28)
| David Robinson (8)
| Derek Anderson (7)
| United Center21,793
| 18–11
|- bgcolor="#ccffcc"
| 30
| December 30
| @ Indiana
| 
| Malik Rose (20)
| Malik Rose (13)
| Derek Anderson (7)
| Conseco Fieldhouse18,345
| 19–11

|- bgcolor="#ccffcc"
| 31
| January 2 
| Miami
| 
| Antonio Daniels (19)
| David Robinson, Tim Duncan (10)
| Sean Elliott (5)
| Alamodome18,412
| 20–11
|- bgcolor="#ccffcc"
| 32
| January 6 
| Detroit
| 
| David Robinson (29)
| David Robinson (22)
| Derek Anderson, Antonio Daniels (6)
| Alamodome20,333
| 21–11
|- bgcolor="#ccffcc"
| 33
| January 9 
| @ Orlando
| 
| David Robinson (26)
| Tim Duncan (11)
| Derek Anderson (7)
| TD Waterhouse Centre14,320
| 22–11
|- bgcolor="#ccffcc"
| 34
| January 12 
| @ Detroit
| 
| Derek Anderson (25)
| Tim Duncan (11)
| Tim Duncan (7)
| The Palace of Auburn Hills14,576
| 23–11
|- bgcolor="#ffcccc"
| 35
| January 13 
| @ Philadelphia
| 
| Tim Duncan (29)
| David Robinson, Danny Ferry (7)
| Antonio Daniels (6)
| First Union Center20,607
| 23–12
|- bgcolor="#ffcccc"
| 36
| January 15
| @ New York
| 
| Antonio Daniels, Tim Duncan, Ira Newble (14)
| Tim Duncan (10)
| Derek Anderson (4)
| Madison Square Garden19,763
| 23–13
|- bgcolor="#ffcccc"
| 37
| January 17
| Toronto
| 
| Tim Duncan (22)
| Tim Duncan (11)
| Derek Anderson, Terry Porter (4)
| Alamodome17,044
| 23–14
|- bgcolor="#ffcccc"
| 38
| January 20
| Orlando
| 
| Tim Duncan (29)
| Tim Duncan, David Robinson (17)
| Antonio Daniels (12)
| Alamodome31,888
| 23–15
|- bgcolor="#ccffcc"
| 39
| January 23
| Vancouver
| 
| Tim Duncan (23)
| Samaki Walker (13)
| Antonio Daniels (8)
| Alamodome14,764
| 24–15
|- bgcolor="#ccffcc"
| 40
| January 25
| @ Sacramento
| 
| Tim Duncan (36)
| Tim Duncan (21)
| Antonio Daniels (10)
| ARCO Arena17,317
| 25–15
|- bgcolor="#ccffcc"
| 41
| January 27
| @ Utah
| 
| Tim Duncan (33)
| Tim Duncan, Terry Porter (10)
| Terry Porter (8)
| Delta Center19,911
| 26–15
|- bgcolor="#ccffcc"
| 42
| January 29
| @ L. A. Clippers
| 
| Tim Duncan (16)
| Tim Duncan, Derek Anderson (8)
| Derek Anderson (7)
| Staples Center14,721
| 27–15
|- bgcolor="#ccffcc"
| 43
| January 31
| L. A. Clippers
| 
| Tim Duncan (22)
| Tim Duncan (16)
| Derek Anderson (5)
| Alamodome13,738
| 28–15

|- bgcolor="#ccffcc"
| 44
| February 3
| Houston
| 
| Tim Duncan (28)
| Tim Duncan (11)
| Derek Anderson (9)
| Alamodome24,870
| 29–15
|- bgcolor="#ccffcc"
| 45
| February 5
| Golden State
| 
| Tim Duncan (24)
| Tim Duncan (12)
| Tim Duncan, Malik Rose, Derrick Dial (4)
| Alamodome13,889
| 30–15
|- bgcolor="#ccffcc"
| 46
| February 7
| @ Golden State
| 
| Tim Duncan (23)
| Tim Duncan (12)
| Antonio Daniels (12)
| Gund Arena13,324
| 31–15
|- bgcolor="#ffcccc"
| 47
| February 8
| @ New Jersey
| 
| Tim Duncan (35)
| Tim Duncan (21)
| Terry Porter (7)
| Continental Airlines Arena12,740
| 31–16
|- align="center"
|colspan="9" bgcolor="#bbcaff"|All-Star Break
|- bgcolor="#ffcccc"
| 48
| February 13
| Dallas
| 
| Tim Duncan (28)
| Tim Duncan (15)
| Tim Duncan, Derek Anderson (6)
| Alamodome17,705
| 32–16
|- bgcolor="#ccffcc"
| 49
| February 15
| Washington
| 
| Tim Duncan (19)
| Tim Duncan (12)
| Antonio Daniels (6)
| Alamodome14,613
| 33–16
|- bgcolor="#ccffcc"
| 50
| February 16
| @ Minnesota
| 
| Tim Duncan (26)
| Tim Duncan (12)
| Antonio Daniels (4)
| Target Center18,881
| 34–16
|- bgcolor="#ccffcc"
| 51
| February 18
| @ Toronto
| 
| Tim Duncan (20)
| Tim Duncan (13)
| David Robinson (5)
| Air Canada Centre19,800
| 35–16
|- bgcolor="#ffcccc"
| 52
| February 19
| @ Milwaukee
| 
| Derek Anderson (25)
| Tim Duncan (13)
| Derek Anderson, Antonio Daniels (6)
| Bradley Center16,487
| 35–17
|- bgcolor="#ffcccc"
| 53
| February 21
| L. A. Lakers
| 
| Derek Anderson (23)
| Derek Anderson, David Robinson (8)
| Terry Porter (8)
| Alamodome29,849
| 35–18
|- bgcolor="#ccffcc"
| 54
| February 23
| Boston
| 
| Derek Anderson (20)
| Tim Duncan, David Robinson (10)
| Tim Duncan (6)
| Alamodome24,996
| 36–18
|- bgcolor="#ccffcc"
| 55
| February 24
| Dallas
| 
| Tim Duncan (31)
| Tim Duncan (13)
| Derek Anderson (6)
| Reunion Arena18,187
| 37–18
|- bgcolor="#ffcccc"
| 56
| February 27
| Portland
| 
| Tim Duncan (31)
| Tim Duncan (13)
| Derek Anderson (6)
| Alamodome20,323
| 37–19

|- bgcolor="#ccffcc"
| 57
| March 1
| Phoenix
| 
| Tim Duncan (25)
| David Robinson (11)
| Terry Porter (9)
| Alamodome16,209
| 38–19
|- bgcolor="#ccffcc"
| 58
| March 3
| Atlanta
| 
| Tim Duncan (26)
| David Robinson (15)
| Danny Ferry (4)
| Alamodome29,974
| 39–19
|- bgcolor="#ccffcc"
| 59
| March 5
| Vancouver
| 
| Derek Anderson (25)
| Tim Duncan (13)
| Antonio Daniels (5)
| General Motors Place10,798
| 40–19
|- bgcolor="#ccffcc"
| 60
| March 6
| @ Seattle
| 
| Tim Duncan (22)
| Tim Duncan, David Robinson (9)
| Avery Johnson (6)
| KeyArena14,392
| 41–19
|- bgcolor="#ccffcc"
| 61
| March 8
| @ Portland
| 
| Derek Anderson (29)
| Tim Duncan (16)
| Tim Duncan (6)
| Rose Garden Arena20,267
| 42–19
|- bgcolor="#ccffcc"
| 62
| March 9
| @ L. A. Lakers
| 
| Tim Duncan (29)
| Tim Duncan (12)
| Avery Johnson (5)
| Staples Center18,997
| 43–19
|- bgcolor="#ccffcc"
| 63
| March 12
| L. A. Clippers
| 
| Tim Duncan (28)
| David Robinson (12)
| Antonio Daniels (6)
| Alamodome21,974
| 44–19
|- bgcolor="#ccffcc"
| 64
| March 14
| Minnesota
| 
| Derek Anderson (30)
| Tim Duncan (20)
| Terry Porter (5)
| Alamodome35,676
| 45–19
|- bgcolor="#ccffcc"
| 65
| March 16
| New Jersey
| 
| Tim Duncan (29)
| Tim Duncan (16)
| Avery Johnson (5)
| Alamodome21,726
| 46–19
|- bgcolor="#ffcccc"
| 66
| March 17
| @ Houston
| 
| Tim Duncan (25)
| Tim Duncan (16)
| Derek Anderson, Avery Johnson (5)
| Compaq Center16,285
| 46–20
|- bgcolor="#ccffcc"
| 67
| March 19
| Portland
| 
| Derek Anderson (28)
| Tim Duncan (23)
| Terry Porter (10)
| Alamodome22,393
| 47–20
|- bgcolor="#ccffcc"
| 68
| March 21
| @ Boston
| 
| Derek Anderson (26)
| Tim Duncan (14)
| Avery Johnson (7)
| FleetCenter15,764
| 48–20
|- bgcolor="#ccffcc"
| 69
| March 22
| @ Atlanta
| 
| Derek Anderson (23)
| David Robinson, Tim Duncan (10)
| Terry Porter (8)
| Philips Arena12,124
| 49–20
|- bgcolor="#ffcccc"
| 70
| March 25
| @ Atlanta
| 
| Tim Duncan (26)
| Tim Duncan (14)
| Derek Anderson (4)
| AmericanAirlines Arena16,500
| 49–21
|- bgcolor="#ccffcc"
| 71
| March 27
| Charlotte
| 
| Tim Duncan (34)
| Tim Duncan (19)
| Avery Johnson (5)
| Alamodome22,109
| 50–21
|- bgcolor="#ccffcc"
| 72
| March 29
| Utah
| 
| Tim Duncan (29)
| Tim Duncan (7)
| Derek Anderson (6)
| Alamodome24,327
| 51–21
|- bgcolor="#ffcccc"
| 73
| March 31
| Milwaukee
| 
| Tim Duncan (20)
| Tim Duncan (12)
| Avery Johnson (5)
| Alamodome35,944
| 51–22

|- bgcolor="#ccffcc"
| 74
| April 3
| Seattle
| 
| Tim Duncan (30)
| Tim Duncan (14)
| Avery Johnson (10)
| Alamodome19,672
| 52–22
|- bgcolor="#ccffcc"
| 75
| April 5
| @ Denver
| 
| Tim Duncan (36)
| Tim Duncan (13)
| Avery Johnson (12)
| Pepsi Center13,796
| 53–22
|- bgcolor="#ccffcc"
| 76
| April 7
| @ L. A. Clippers
| 
| Tim Duncan (32)
| Tim Duncan (18)
| Tim Duncan (6)
| Staples Center18,964
| 54–22
|- bgcolor="#ccffcc"
| 77
| April 8
| @ Golden State
| 
| Tim Duncan (28)
| Tim Duncan (9)
| Avery Johnson (4)
| The Arena in Oakland15,273
| 55–22
|- bgcolor="#ccffcc"
| 78
| April 10
| Dallas
| 
| David Robinson (34)
| David Robinson (11)
| Tim Duncan (6)
| Alamodome25,682
| 56–22
|- bgcolor="#ffcccc"
| 79
| April 12
| Sacramento
| 
| Tim Duncan (42)
| Tim Duncan, David Robinson (11)
| Tim Duncan, Avery Johnson (5)
| Alamodome34,357
| 56–23
|- bgcolor="#ccffcc"
| 80
| April 14
| Denver
| 
| David Robinson (25)
| Tim Duncan (15)
| Derek Anderson (7)
| Alamodome34,397
| 57–23
|- bgcolor="#ccffcc"
| 81
| April 17
| @ Portland
| 
| Tim Duncan (18)
| David Robinson (9)
| Antonio Daniels (6)
| Rose Garden Arena20,580
| 58–23
|- bgcolor="#ffcccc"
| 82
| April 18
| @ Seattle
| 
| Shawnelle Scott (14)
| Shawnelle Scott (14)
| Derek Anderson (5)
| KeyArena16,049
| 58–24

Playoffs

|- align="center" bgcolor="#ccffcc"
| 1
| April 21
| Minnesota
| W 87–82
| Tim Duncan (33)
| Tim Duncan (15)
| Duncan, Ferry (4)
| Alamodome33,983
| 1–0
|- align="center" bgcolor="#ccffcc"
| 2
| April 23
| Minnesota
| W 86–69
| Tim Duncan (18)
| Duncan, Robinson (11)
| Duncan, Porter (4)
| Alamodome31,759
| 2–0
|- align="center" bgcolor="#ffcccc"
| 3
| April 28
| @ Minnesota
| L 84–93
| David Robinson (22)
| David Robinson (17)
| Derek Anderson (4)
| Target Center17,676
| 2–1
|- align="center" bgcolor="#ccffcc"
| 4
| April 30
| @ Minnesota
| W 97–84
| Tim Duncan (24)
| Tim Duncan (16)
| Derek Anderson (6)
| Target Center16,336
| 3–1
|-

|- align="center" bgcolor="#ccffcc"
| 1
| May 5
| Dallas
| W 94–78
| Tim Duncan (31)
| Tim Duncan (13)
| Avery Johnson (8)
| Alamodome32,798
| 1–0
|- align="center" bgcolor="#ccffcc"
| 2
| May 7
| Dallas
| W 100–86
| Tim Duncan (25)
| Tim Duncan (22)
| Terry Porter (9)
| Alamodome27,690
| 2–0
|- align="center" bgcolor="#ccffcc"
| 3
| May 9
| @ Dallas
| W 104–90
| David Robinson (19)
| Duncan, Robinson (14)
| Avery Johnson (6)
| Reunion Arena18,237
| 3–0
|- align="center" bgcolor="#ffcccc"
| 4
| May 12
| @ Dallas
| L 108–112
| Tim Duncan (29)
| Tim Duncan (18)
| Terry Porter (8)
| Reunion Arena18,187
| 3–1
|- align="center" bgcolor="#ccffcc"
| 5
| May 14
| Dallas
| W 105–87
| Tim Duncan (32)
| Tim Duncan (20)
| Antonio Daniels (9)
| Alamodome25,853
| 4–1
|-

|- align="center" bgcolor="#ffcccc"
| 1
| May 19
| L.A. Lakers
| L 90–104
| Tim Duncan (28)
| Tim Duncan (14)
| Tim Duncan (6)
| Alamodome36,068
| 0–1
|- align="center" bgcolor="#ffcccc"
| 2
| May 21
| L.A. Lakers
| L 81–88
| Tim Duncan (40)
| Tim Duncan (15)
| Antonio Daniels (5)
| Alamodome35,574
| 0–2
|- align="center" bgcolor="#ffcccc"
| 3
| May 25
| @ L.A. Lakers
| L 72–111
| David Robinson (24)
| Tim Duncan (13)
| Tim Duncan (7)
| Staples Center18,997
| 0–3
|- align="center" bgcolor="#ffcccc"
| 4
| May 27
| @ L.A. Lakers
| L 82–111
| Daniels, Duncan (15)
| David Robinson (11)
| Terry Porter (4)
| Staples Center18,997
| 0–4
|-

Player statistics

Regular season

Playoffs

Awards and records
Tim Duncan, All-NBA First Team
David Robinson, All-NBA Third Team
Tim Duncan, NBA All-Defensive First Team

See also
2000-01 NBA season

References

San Antonio Spurs seasons
San Antonio
San Antonio
San Antonio